The Parque Marítimo César Manrique is an entertainment complex, designed by architect César Manrique, located in the city of Santa Cruz de Tenerife (Tenerife, Spain).

The park is located in the current area of expansion of the capital of island, close to other buildings such as the Centro Internacional de Ferias y Congresos de Tenerife, the Auditorio de Tenerife, the Palmetum of Santa Cruz de Tenerife and the Torres de Santa Cruz. Direct access to the TF-1 motorway southbound and TF-5 northbound.

Facilities 
Parque Marítimo César Manrique covers 22,000 square meters and was inaugurated in 1995. The complex features elements of nature, such as volcanic rocks, palm trees and ornamental plants. These are the park's main facilities:

 Three pools (with water drawn from the sea)
 Artificial waterfall
 Restaurants
 Gym
 Games room
 Hot springs jacuzzi
 Children's play areas
 Sports facilities
 Small beach

External links 
 Parque Marítimo César Manrique, Official Website for Tourism in the city of Santa Cruz de Tenerife

Santa Cruz de Tenerife
Parks in Tenerife
1995 establishments in Spain